The PEN/Malamud Award and Memorial Reading honors "excellence in the art of the short story", and is awarded annually by the PEN/Faulkner Foundation. The selection committee is composed of PEN/Faulkner directors and representatives of Bernard Malamud's literary executors. The award was first given in 1988.

The award is one of many PEN awards sponsored by International PEN affiliates in over 145 PEN centres around the world.

Award winners

References

External links
PEN/Faulkner Foundation

PEN/Faulkner Foundation awards
Awards established in 1988
1988 establishments in the United States
Short story awards